Fidar, municipality in the Byblos District of  Keserwan-Jbeil Governorate, Lebanon. It is 61 kilometers north of Beirut. Fdar has an average elevation of 100 meters above sea level and a total land area of 390 hectares. As of 2008, the village contained one public school with 206 students enrolled. Nassib Zgheib is the president of the municipality since 2019. This small village is also known for his 800-year-old church (kniset saïdet el doueir).

References

Populated places in Byblos District